Neurophyseta clymenalis is a moth in the family Crambidae. It was described by Francis Walker in 1859. It is found in Bolivia, Brazil, Colombia, Costa Rica, Dominica, Ecuador, El Salvador, Guatemala, Mexico, Peru and Venezuela.

References

Moths described in 1859
Musotiminae